David Downey (born 1942) was the Canadian Middleweight Champion (1967–1977) and was a member of the Boxing Downeys dynasty.  He was the son of George Downey and is the father of Olympian Ray Downey. He is in the Canadian Boxing Hall of Fame and the Nova Scotia Sports Hall of Fame.

See also
 Boxing in Canada

References

Further reading 
 Robert Ashe. Halifax Champion: Black Power in Gloves. [Life of Dave Downey] Formac. 2005

External links 
 
 Video - Downey Inducted into NS Sport Hall of Fame (1999)
 Image of Downey, 1972

Canadian male boxers
1942 births
Living people
Sportspeople from Halifax, Nova Scotia
Nova Scotia Sport Hall of Fame inductees
Black Nova Scotians
Black Canadian boxers
Middleweight boxers